Zhou Mi may refer to:

Zhou Mi (badminton) (born 1979), Chinese female badminton player
Zhou Mi (singer) (born 1986), Chinese recording artist and entertainer